Qwest Communications International, Inc. was a United States telecommunications carrier. Qwest provided local service in 14 western and midwestern U.S. states: Arizona, Colorado, Idaho, Iowa, Minnesota, Montana, Nebraska, New Mexico, North Dakota, Oregon, South Dakota, Utah, Washington, and Wyoming.

On April 22, 2010, CenturyLink announced it would acquire Qwest in a stock transaction. The merger closed on April 1, 2011. Qwest began doing business as CenturyLink in August 2011.

Qwest provided voice, Internet backbone data services, and digital television in some areas. It operated in three segments: Wireline Services, Wireless Services, and Other Services. The Wireline Services segment provided local voice, long-distance voice, and data and Internet (DSL) services to consumers, businesses, and wholesale customers, as well as access services to wholesale customers. The Wireless Services segment was achieved by a partnership with Verizon Wireless. Qwest also partnered with DirecTV to provide digital television service to its customers. In Phoenix, Denver, Salt Lake City, Boise, and Omaha, Qwest offered Qwest Choice TV (later also known as Qwest Digital Television), an IPTV service over DSL. This service was retired in October 2008 (after being no longer available to new customers in May 2008), leaving DirecTV as the only TV service Qwest provided. Qwest Choice TV customers were moved to DirecTV. The Other Services segment primarily involved the sublease of real estate assets, such as space in office buildings, warehouses, and other properties.

Qwest Communications also provided long-distance services and broadband data, as well as voice and video communications globally. The company sold its products and services to small businesses, governmental entities, and public and private educational institutions through various channels, including direct-sales marketing, telemarketing, arrangements with third-party agents, company's Web site, and partnership relations. As of September 13, 2005, Qwest had 98 retail stores in 14 states. Qwest Communications was headquartered in Denver, Colorado at 1801 California Street, in the second tallest building in Denver at 53 stories. The majority of Qwest occupational or non-management employees were represented by two labor unions; the Communications Workers of America and in Montana, the International Brotherhood of Electrical Workers. Qwest also had software development centers in Bangalore and Noida (New Delhi), India called Qwest Software Services.

History

Founding
Founded in 1996 by Philip Anschutz, Qwest began in an unconventional way. Anschutz, who owned the Southern Pacific Transportation Company at the time, established the subsidiary Southern Pacific Telecommunications Company and began installing the first all-digital, fiber-optic infrastructure along his railroad lines and connecting them into central junctions in strategic locations to serve businesses with high-speed data and T1 services. In 1997, the Southern Pacific Transportation Company merged with Union Pacific. At that time Anschutz had a contract with Frontier Communications and other carriers to lay nationwide fiber for them along the railway lines; he took advantage of this situation and laid his own fiber along the route and this asset was kept separate from the railroad merger with Union Pacific. In 1995, SP Telecom moved from San Francisco to Denver after acquiring Dallas-based Qwest Communications Corp., a digital microwave system owner, taking over its name and facilities. The Qwest headquarters were at 555 17th Street.

Qwest Communications grew aggressively, acquiring internet service provider SuperNet in 1997, followed by the acquisition of LCI, a low cost long-distance carrier (located in Dublin, Ohio and McLean, Virginia) in 1998, and followed again by the acquisition of Icon CMT, a web hosting provider, also in 1998. This launched Qwest as not only a provider of high speed data to the niche market of corporate customers, but also a quick-growing residential and business long-distance customer base that it quickly merged into its data service.

US West acquisition

Qwest merged with "Baby Bell" US West on June 30, 2000 through an apparent hostile takeover. Philip Anschutz owned 17.5% of the resulting company. Unlike prior merger transactions between the Baby Bells, in which the acquired entities survived as subsidiaries of SBC Communications and Bell Atlantic, US WEST ceased to exist when it was immediately absorbed into Qwest with all subsidiaries of US WEST becoming directly owned by Qwest.

As a condition of the merger, Qwest was required to sell off its long-distance operations in the 14-state boundary in which it provided local telephone services. They were eventually sold to Touch America. In 2003, Qwest acquired Touch America from 360networks after Touch America filed for bankruptcy. The acquisition ended ongoing disputes between the two companies in which Touch America alleged Qwest continued to illegally sell long-distance services within the former US WEST region.

Directory operations sale
In 2002, Qwest agreed to sell its directory operations, QwestDex, to private equity firms The Carlyle Group and Welsh, Carson, Anderson & Stowe for $7 billion. The sale allowed Qwest to generate cash to fend off a bankruptcy filing to which it may have had to resort due to significant amounts of debt it had incurred since the collapse of the dot-com bubble. The resulting company was named Dex Media, when the sale was completed in 2004.

Alliances
Qwest Communications has partnered with other major communications companies during its history.

In Europe, Qwest partnered with the Dutch national telecom operator KPN to create the pan-European data communications and hosting company KPNQwest. KPNQwest was formed in November 1998 and went on to launch an initial public offering on the Nasdaq and Amsterdam stock Exchanges in November 1999. KPNQwest collapsed in bankruptcy in 2002.

In the US, Qwest partnered with AT&T and Verizon to form Movearoo.com. Created on July 9, 2008, the website is a program designed to help customers in the process of moving find home service providers available in their area.

Problems

Customer complaints and consumer issues
One of the historically significant mass complaints regarding Qwest involved allegations that the then-long-distance-only company switched local telephone service customers over to Qwest's long-distance service without their permission, an illegal practice known as slamming. In July 2000, Qwest paid a $1.5 million fine to the Federal Communications Commission to resolve slamming complaints. In April 2001, they paid a $350,000 fine to the Pennsylvania Bureau of Consumer Protection after the state cited them for deceptive advertising and slamming practices. The company's settlements included a requirement that all of its sales employees sign a pledge stating that slamming was barred and a condition for dismissal from Qwest employment.

Accounting and insider trading irregularities
The company was also involved in accounting scandals, and was fined $250 million by the U.S. Securities and Exchange Commission (SEC), to be split into two $125 million payments due to the poor state of Qwest's current financial health. Among the transactions in question were a series of deals from 1999 to 2001 with Enron's broadband division which may have helped Enron conceal losses. In 2005, former Chairman and chief executive officer (CEO) Joseph Nacchio, former President and chief operating officer (COO) Afshin Mohebbi and seven other former Qwest employees were accused of fraud in a civil lawsuit filed by the SEC. Separately, Nacchio was convicted of 19 counts of insider trading in Qwest stock on April 19, 2007. On March 31, 2011, US Federal Judge Marcia Krieger issued a summary judgement rejecting all SEC's claims against Afshin Mohebbi and ruling in his favor.

Qwest's slogan from 1998-2002 was "Ride The Light", which was meant to portray the company as technologically advanced. In October 2002, Richard C. Notebaert, who took over as CEO in June of that year, introduced the "Spirit of Service" campaign which promotes the company as being refocused on customer satisfaction. This slogan was in use until October 2008.

In 2004, Qwest became the first Regional Bell operating company (RBOC) in the United States to offer Standalone DSL (also known as Naked DSL), i.e. DSL Internet service that does not require the customer to have local landline phone service.

Refusal of NSA surveillance requests 
In May 2006, USA Today reported that millions of telephone calling records had been handed over to the United States National Security Agency by AT&T Corp., Verizon, and BellSouth since September 11, 2001. This data has been used to create a database of all international and domestic calls. Qwest was allegedly the lone holdout, despite threats from the NSA that their refusal to cooperate may jeopardize future government contracts, a decision which has earned them praise from those who oppose the NSA program.

In the case of ACLU v. NSA, U.S. District Judge Anna Diggs Taylor on August 17, 2006 ruled that the government's domestic eavesdropping program is unconstitutional and ordered it ended immediately. The Bush Administration filed an appeal in the case, and Judge Taylor's decision was overturned by the appeals court on the basis of a lack of standing.

Former Qwest CEO Joseph Nacchio alleged in appeal documents that the NSA requested that Qwest participate in its wiretapping program more than six months before September 11, 2001. Nacchio recalled the meeting as occurring on February 27, 2001. Nacchio further claimed that the NSA cancelled a lucrative contract with Qwest as a result of Qwest's refusal to participate in the wiretapping program. On April 14, 2009, Nacchio surrendered to a federal prison camp in Schuylkill, Pennsylvania, to begin serving a six-year sentence for an insider trading conviction. The United States Supreme Court denied bail pending appeal the same day.

A social media experiment and website covering the Qwest holdout, "Thank you Qwest dot Org" built by Netherlands-based webmaster Richard Kastelein and American expatriate journalist Chris Floyd, was covered by the CNN Situation Room, USA Today, New York Times, International Herald Tribune, Denver Post, News.com, and the Salt Lake Tribune.

Merger with CenturyLink 

On April 22, 2010, CenturyLink announced it would acquire Qwest in a transaction of 0.1664 shares of CenturyLink common stock for each share of Qwest common stock. CenturyLink shareholders would hold a 50.5% share of ownership in the combined company, while Qwest shareholders would own the remaining 49.5%. The valuation of CenturyLink's purchase as of April 21, 2010, was $22.4 billion, including the assumption of $11.8 billion of outstanding debt held by Qwest as of December 31, 2009. Qwest started to do business as CenturyLink from August 8, 2011.

Corporate structure

Qwest Communications International, Inc. was the holding company. It was the parent company of many more entities, but those listed below were the main operating units:

 Qwest Corporation was an incumbent local exchange carrier (ILEC), and since it was part of the AT&T Bell Operating System as Mountain Bell, it is also a Bell Operating Company. Qwest Corporation serves an in-region local market which consists of the 14 states in which the pre-merger U S WEST provided local telephone service. Qwest Corporation also provides administrative and operation services such as financial, human resources, IT, and legal to the Qwest family of companies—the Qwest affiliates. It also owns El Paso County Telephone.
 Qwest L D Corp. was a subsidiary providing long-distance calling services within the Qwest Corporation operating boundaries.
 Qwest Communications Company, LLC was an affiliate of Qwest that can provide local services but currently provides long-distance telephone and long-haul data services. It was the classic pre U S WEST merger entity founded in 1966 as Southern Pacific Telecommunications Company. Qwest Communications Corporation changed its name and corporate status on January 2, 2009, to a limited liability company. Qwest Communications made an agreement with CSX in which it could use its rail lines as a right-of-way for a fiber-optic system. Qwest Communications International, the holding company, took the slogan Ride the Light as a result of this.

Defunct entities

 Malheur Home Telephone Company: Commonly known as Malheur Bell, it was merged into its corporate parent Qwest Corporation on December 14, 2009.
 Qwest Interprise America: Merged into Qwest Service Corporation in 2007 then moved to Qwest Communications Company, LLC.
 Qwest Services Corporation: While still a legal entity, it previously supplied the administrative and operation services Qwest Corporation currently provides.
 Qwest Cyber.Solutions: Operated as an application service provider (ASP) in the late 1990s and early 2000s (decade) hosting, managing and integrating complex software offerings such as SAP, Oracle and JD Edwards.
 U S WEST, Inc.: The Regional Bell Operating Company it merged with in 2000. Qwest was legally merged into USWEST, Inc. on June 30, 2000, and USWEST was renamed Qwest.

See also

 Qwest Wireless

Notes

References 
 Qwest admits improper accounts - 29 July, 2002
 Qwest Connections and Microsoft Sign a Contract for Qwest to offer Windows Live Services with their DSL service
 Qwest Offer Windows Live Services
 Phone Utilities Won't Give Details About Eavesdropping
 Congressman asks Justice Dept. about Qwest wiretap charges

External links
Qwest Website
CenturyLink and Qwest Agree to Merge
Bell Operating Companies
Name change from SP Telecom to Qwest announcement
Yahoo! - Qwest Communications International Inc. Company Profile
Qwest NSA Website - One major telecommunications company declined to participate in the NSA program: Qwest.
Vintage Qwest Commercial 2002
Archive of Qwest Intercept Messages

Lumen Technologies
Companies based in Denver
Economy of the Midwestern United States
Economy of the Northwestern United States
Economy of the Southwestern United States
Internet service providers of the United States
Telecommunications companies of the United States
Telecommunications companies established in 1996
2011 mergers and acquisitions